The 2009 South Asian Football Federation Championship was hosted by Bangladesh from 4 to 13 December 2009.  Bangladesh was awarded to host the tournament after the withdrawal of original hosts India.

After India's reluctance to host the tournament, in May 2009, at the Asian Football Confederation (AFC) Congress in Kuala Lumpur, Malaysia, Bangladesh Football Federation (BFF) president Kazi Salahuddin on his return from the AFC Congress informed that although India were still retaining their status as hosts of the championship, Bangladesh and Nepal had turned in fresh bids in anticipation of staging this prestigious eight-nation meet.

A decision was taken at the FIFA Congress in Bahamas in the first week of June but no announcement was officially made. In July, with the tournament drawing ever closer, media reports once again suggested that the tournament would be moved once again to Bangladesh, as Pakistan would struggle to obtain visas if the tournament is hosted in India.

On 31 August 2009, it was reported that the tournament would be held in Bangladesh, after the Indian football association (AIFF) had its annual congress at the end of August. This was formally confirmed by the AFC on 10 September through a press release.

Venue
The Bangabandhu National Stadium in Dhaka was the only venue for the tournament. It is also home venue for Bangladesh national football team.

Squads

Draw
The draw for the tournament was made on 3 October 2009. India took part with their U-23 team

Group stage

Group A

Group B

Knockout stage

Semi-finals

Final

Champion

Goalscorers
4 goals

  Enamul Haque
  Ahmed Thariq
  Channa Ediri Bandalage

3 goals

  Ali Ashfaq
  Ibrahim Fazeel
  Arif Mehmood
  Kasun Jayasuriya

2 goals

  Sushil Kumar Singh
  Anil Gurung
  Muhammad Essa
  Chathura Gunarathne

1 goal

  Hashmatullah Barakzai
  Jahid Hasan Ameli
  Prantosh Kumar Das
  Nawang Dendup
  Jeje Lalpekhlua
  Assad Ali
  Bijaya Gurung
  Ju Manu Rai
  Reis Ashraf
  Shabir Khan

References

 
2009
2009 in Asian football
2009
2009–10 in Sri Lankan football
2009 in Maldivian football
2009–10 in Pakistani football
2009 in Nepalese sport
2009 in Bhutanese football
2009 in Bangladeshi football
2009 in Afghan football
2009–10 in Indian football